Helga Ernestine Rafelski, (née Betz) (3 September 1949 - 5 November 2000) was a German particle physicist. She got her professional degree from Goethe-Universität Frankfurt am Main, her masters degree from University of Illinois at Chicago in 1977 and her PhD from University of Cape Town in 1988. She studied muon-catalysed fusion and relativistic heavy-ion collisions.

Returning from South-Africa, Rafelski held a visiting position at Goethe-Universität Frankfurt am Main where she worked with Berndt Müller. In-between other appointments she was a scientific associate at CERN in the Data Handling Division.

Helga Rafelski died of cancer in November 2000.

References 

1949 births
2000 deaths

Particle physicists
Women physicists
University of Cape Town alumni
People associated with CERN
University of Illinois Chicago alumni